Bennigsenium is a genus of beetles in the family Cicindelidae, containing the following species:

 Bennigsenium basilewsky (Cassola, 1978)
 Bennigsenium bodongi (W. Horn, 1914)
 Bennigsenium discoscriptum (W. Horn, 1914)
 Bennigsenium grossesculptum Cassola & Werner, 2003
 Bennigsenium grossumbreve (W. Horn, 1914)
 Bennigsenium hauseranum W. Horn, 1905
 Bennigsenium insperatum (H. Kolbe, 1915)
 Bennigsenium ismenioides (W. Horn, 1913)
 Bennigsenium kakonkianum Cassola & Miskell, 2001
 Bennigsenium planicorne W. Horn, 1897
 Bennigsenium unciferum Cassola & Werner, 2003

References

Cicindelidae